Opera House is a 1961 Indian Hindi-language mystery film produced by A.A. Nadiadwala and directed by P.L. Santoshi. The film stars Ajit, B. Saroja Devi, K.N. Singh and Lalita Pawar among others. It marked Saroja Devi's Bollywood debut.

Plot
Saroj (B. Saroja Devi) lives a poor lifestyle in Nagpur along with her widowed mother, Leela Sharma (Lalita Pawar) and a younger sister, Nanhi. She gets employed as a singer/dancer in Bombay and relocates there. Once there, she meets with Ajit Rai (Ajit), and the couple fall in love. Circumstances compel her to re-locate to Nagpur and seek employment with another dance/drama company run by Chunilal. Ajit decides to follow her to Nagpur, and visits her mother and sister. It is from here he locates the dance/drama company and does meet Saroj — only to find out that she has changed her name to Mary D'Souza. Ajit will eventually discover that Saroj had witnessed the murder of Chunilal and the killer(s) are now out to silence her — and whoever else dares to come in their way...

Cast

Soundtrack
Music in the film has been given by Chitragupta and Lyricist is Majrooh Sultanpuri. The song "Dekho Mausam Kya Bahar Hai" is based on the Jim Reeves song "Bimbo".

References

External links
 

1961 films
1960s Hindi-language films
Films set in Mumbai
Films scored by Chitragupta